Earthwind C. Moreland (born June 13, 1977) is a former National Football League (NFL) cornerback for the New England Patriots and Arena Football League cornerback and wide receiver for the Las Vegas Gladiators. He was drafted by Team Alabama of the AAFL in 2008.

High school years
Moreland attended Grady High School in Atlanta and was a letterman in football, basketball, and baseball. In football, he garnered All-City honors.

College years
Moreland attended Georgia Southern University and was a letterman in football. In football, he was a two-time All-Southern Conference selection (junior and senior seasons), he also garnered third-team All-America honors from the Sporting News during his senior year.  Over the course of his college career, he played in 52 games with 42 starts as Georgia Southern won 3 consecutive Southern Conference titles and finished with the NCAA Division I-AA championship.

Professional career
Initially signed as an undrafted rookie free agent by the Tampa Bay Buccaneers in 2000, he was waived and claimed off waivers by the New York Jets in the same off-season, and a year later was traded, along with a sixth-round pick in 2002, to the New Orleans Saints for running back Chad Morton in August 2001, only to be waived by the Saints just over a week later and claimed off waivers by the Jacksonville Jaguars the following day.  Moreland spent about one month with the team before an ultimate release from their practice squad, landing with the Cleveland Browns in the same capacity, and was mostly inactive.  Allocated by the Cleveland Browns to the Rhein Fire of NFL Europe in 2002, where Moreland earned All-League honors as the Fire went on to lose in World Bowl X.  Moreland remained with the team when he returned, then landed on injured reserve with a groin injury.

After being signed and released within a month from August to September 2004 by the New England Patriots, he had a brief stint on the Minnesota Vikings practice squad and was again signed by the Patriots.  He was promoted from the practice squad and found some playing time with the New England Patriots in 2004 due to injuries to the Patriots' secondary (including starters Ty Law and Tyrone Poole), making 2 starts in 9 games.  By the end of the season and during the playoffs, Moreland was the 4th cornerback on the depth chart, behind Asante Samuel, Randall Gay, and wide receiver Troy Brown.  Moreland was released after the season. He spent about 3 weeks over August 2006 attempting to make the cut with the Houston Texans, but did not make the team. He recorded 15 career tackles (14 solo) in the NFL. 

In 2008, Moreland joined the upstart All-American Football League as a protected player with Team Alabama.  However, neither the team nor the league as a whole ever played even a single game.

Personal life
Moreland was named after his mother's favorite band, Earth, Wind & Fire.

External links
Bio page 
AFL stats
NFL stats

1977 births
Living people
Players of American football from Atlanta
American football cornerbacks
Georgia Southern Eagles football players
Tampa Bay Buccaneers players
New York Jets players
New Orleans Saints players
Jacksonville Jaguars players
Cleveland Browns players
Rhein Fire players
New England Patriots players
Minnesota Vikings players
Houston Texans players
Georgia Force players
Las Vegas Gladiators players